Karl-Romet Nõmm (born 4 January 1998) is an Estonian professional footballer who currently plays as a goalkeeper for I liga club Sandecja Nowy Sącz and the Estonia national team.

Club career
Nõmm started his career in Viljandi Tulevik and debuted in Estonian top division Meistriliiga on 7 March 2015 when he was 17-years old.

He joined Flora in December 2020.

In January 2023, he signed a 1 and a half year deal with Polish club Sandecja Nowy Sącz.

International career
Nõmm made his senior international debut for Estonia on 12 January 2023, in a 1–0 victory over Finland in a friendly.

Honours

Flora
Meistriliiga: 2022
Estonian Supercup: 2021

Tulevik
Esiliiga: 2016

References

External links

1998 births
Living people
People from Viljandi Parish
Estonian footballers
Association football goalkeepers
Esiliiga B players
Esiliiga players
Meistriliiga players
I liga players
Viljandi JK Tulevik players
FC Flora players
Sandecja Nowy Sącz players
Estonia youth international footballers
Estonia under-21 international footballers
Estonia international footballers
Estonian expatriate footballers
Expatriate footballers in Poland
Estonian expatriate sportspeople in Poland